Rolf Bühler (born 29 December 1942) is a Swiss athlete. He competed in the men's javelin throw at the 1968 Summer Olympics.

References

1942 births
Living people
Athletes (track and field) at the 1968 Summer Olympics
Swiss male javelin throwers
Olympic athletes of Switzerland
Place of birth missing (living people)